Buhler, Buehler, or Bühler may refer to:

 Bühler, Appenzell Ausserrhoden, Switzerland
 Bühler (river), in Baden-Württemberg, Germany
 Buhler (surname)
 Buhler, Kansas, United States
 Bühler Group, a Swiss plant equipment manufacturer
 Buhler Industries, a Canadian farm equipment manufacturer
 Buehler Foods, a grocery store chain in Illinois, Indiana, and Kentucky
 Buehler's, a grocery store chain in northeastern Ohio, USA

See also 
 
 Bueler (disambiguation)
 Buhle